The Boy with Green Hair is a 1948 American fantasy-drama film in Technicolor directed by Joseph Losey in his feature film directorial debut. It stars Dean Stockwell as Peter, a young war orphan who is subject to ridicule after his hair mysteriously turns green, and is based on the 1946 short story of the same name. Co-stars include Pat O'Brien, Robert Ryan, and Barbara Hale.  The film was released on DVD on March 10, 2010, as part of the Warner Archive Collection.

The overall construction is an allegorical anti-war story, with the message that war always damages children.

Plot
Finding a curiously silent young runaway boy whose head has been completely shaved, small-town police call in a psychologist who discovers that the boy is a war orphan named Peter Fry. Peter tells the story of his life to the psychologist.

After staying with a series of neglectful aunts and uncles, he is sent to live with an understanding retired actor named Gramp. Peter starts attending school and begins living the life of a normal boy, until his class gets involved with trying to help war orphans in Europe and Asia.

Peter soon discovers that, like the children on the posters whose images haunt him, he too is a war orphan. The realization about his parents and the work helping the orphans makes Peter turn very serious, and he is further troubled when he overhears the adults around him talking about the world preparing for another war. The next day, after having a bath, Peter is drying his hair with a towel when, to his astonishment, he sees that his hair has turned green. After being taunted by the townspeople and his peers, he runs away.

Suddenly, appearing before him in a lonely part of the woods, are the orphaned children whose pictures he saw on the posters. They tell him that while he is a war orphan, his green hair can make a difference and he must tell people that war is dangerous for children. He leaves determined to deliver this message to any and all. Upon his return, the townspeople, upset about a boy who is now different, urge Gramp to encourage Peter to consider shaving his hair so that it might grow back normally. Peter returns to the woods looking for the orphan children from the posters, but is chased by a group of boys from school who attempt to cut his hair.

He later decides to get his head shaved and the town barber does the job. However, Peter leaves home in the middle of the night, wearing a baseball cap and carrying a baseball bat.

Back in the present, Peter finishes his story. The psychologist tells him that when someone really believes something, they don't run away. Peter leaves and is reunited with Gramp in the station's waiting room. Gramp reads him a letter written by his father, intended for his 16th birthday. Peter's father relates his beliefs about how some things are worth dying for, and if people forget, to "remind them, Peter." Encouraged to keep sharing his message, Peter is sure that his hair will grow back in green again. The psychologist tells Dr. Knudson that he does not care whether the boy's hair was ever actually green or not, but that he agreed with what the boy had to say. Gramp and Peter go home.

Critical reception
Bosley Crowther of The New York Times stated that he was not certain whether the green hair was a figment of the boy's imagination or if "it is intended as a strictly whimsical device."

Cast
 Pat O'Brien as Gramp Fry
 Robert Ryan as Dr. Evans
 Barbara Hale as Miss Brand
 Dean Stockwell as Peter Fry
 Richard Lyon as Michael
 Walter Catlett as The King
 Samuel S. Hinds as Dr. Knudson
 Charles Meredith as Mr. Piper
 Regis Toomey as Mr. Davis
 David Clarke as Barber
 Billy Sheffield as Red
 Johnny Calkins as Danny
 Teddy Infuhr as Timmy
 Dwayne Hickman as Joey
 Eilene Janssen as Peggy.

Dale Robertson, William Smith and Russ Tamblyn appear, but are not credited.

Score
The song "Nature Boy" written by eden ahbez and sung by an uncredited chorus was a primary theme of the score for the motion picture. Nat King Cole's version of "Nature Boy" shot to No. 1 on the Billboard charts, and remained there for eight weeks straight during the summer of 1948.

Cultural references
The 2009 film Battlestar Galactica: The Plan, which also starred (the adult) Dean Stockwell, made extensive reference to The Boy with Green Hair. Director Edward James Olmos, a fan of Stockwell's earlier film, had a replica of Peter's costume created for a war orphan character in The Plan named John. Olmos stated that he wanted John to have green hair, but the studio refused to allow it.

Stockwell's voice acting of Tim Drake in the DC Animated Universe film Batman Beyond: Return of the Joker would also draw inspiration from his performance in this film.

Reception
The film recorded a loss of $420,000.

Crowther gave praise to Stockwell and O'Brien's performances, with other actors being "adequate." He criticized the lack of clarity in regards to the boy's hair, stating that as a plot device it is "banal" and "strangely inconclusive", and the film's logic would be inconsistent with the other processes of the boy's imagination. In conclusion he stated "the gesture falls short of its aim."

Although the film was passed with a 'U' certificate by the British Board of Film Censors on November 26, 1948, its UK release was held back until June 19, 1950.

The film is recognized by American Film Institute in 2004's AFI's 100 Years...100 Songs list: "Nature Boy" – Nominated

"In the 40s", wrote OK! of a TV broadcast of the film in 2000, "Dean Stockwell was a cute kid with 16 films already on his CV. This one – a fantasy about a war orphan whose grief makes his hair colour change – was one of the not bad ones (The Mighty McGurk – now, that was a bad one)."

See also
 Dondi

References

Further reading
 Beaton, Betsy (with sidebar containing brief appreciation by James Hilton). "The Boy With Green Hair". This Week. December 29, 1946. p. 10. 
 Berg, Louis. "Movies: 'The Boy With Green Hair; A boy who was different first made a hit in THIS WEEK fiction story". This Week. August 1, 1948. p. 12. 
 "Please Don't Tell Why His Hair is Green!" (full page ad). Life. November 1, 1948.
 "Green Hair Trouble: Hollywood titans wage a battle over a modest little movie with a message". Life. December 6, 1948. pp 81 and 83-84.

External links
 
 
 
 

1948 films
1948 comedy-drama films
American comedy-drama films
1940s English-language films
Films about orphans
Films directed by Joseph Losey
RKO Pictures films
Films scored by Leigh Harline
Films about bullying
Anti-war films
Films based on short fiction
1948 directorial debut films
1940s American films